Spelobia palmata is a species of fly belonging to the family of the Lesser Dung flies.

Distribution
Andorra, Austria, Belgium, Bulgaria, Croatia, Czech Republic, Denmark, Faeroe Islands, Finland, France, Germany, Great Britain, Greece, Hungary, Ireland, Italy, Norway, Roumania, Russia, Slovakia, Spain, Sweden, Switzerland, Tunisia.

References

Sphaeroceridae
Muscomorph flies of Europe
Diptera of Africa
Insects described in 1927